Talapampa is a village and rural municipality in Salta Province in northwestern Argentina.

References

Populated places in Salta Province